Robert Pockrass (born March 1, 1967) is an American motorsports journalist and on-air talent for Fox Sports who covers NASCAR.

Early life
Pockrass grew up in Indianapolis and attended Indiana University Bloomington, initially being a business major before graduating with a degree in journalism. His older brother was a writer for the Indianapolis News. Pockrass is Jewish and grew up as a fan of the New York Mets.

Career

Pockrass began covering NASCAR in 1991. He started as a sports writer for the Daytona Beach News-Journal from 1991 to 2003. He later covered the sport for SceneDaily.com from 2003 to 2012, Sporting News from 2012 to 2014 and ESPN from 2015 to 2018.

Pockrass joined Fox NASCAR before the 2019 season after being laid off at ESPN following the 2018 NASCAR season due to the network's financial problems and budget cuts.

He is a fan favorite among NASCAR fans on Twitter, as his account provides consistent updates on the NASCAR world on the social media site.

References

External links

American male journalists
Living people
1967 births
Indiana University Bloomington alumni
American sports journalists
Journalists from Indiana
Writers from Indianapolis
21st-century American male writers
20th-century American journalists
20th-century American male writers
21st-century American journalists
ESPN people